Van High School is a public high school located in Van, Texas (USA). It is part of the Van Independent School District located in east central Van Zandt County and classified as a 4A school by the UIL. With just over 750 students, it is the largest high school in Van Zandt County.  In 2015, the school was rated "Met Standard" by the Texas Education Agency.

Academics
The fine arts program has won state in a One Act Play - 
2002(3A), 2005(3A), 2007(3A), 2011(3A).

State Titles
3A UIL State Championships for Poetry and Prose Interpretation.
3A UIL Social Studies Team State Championship in 2010.
3A UIL Current Issues and Events State Championships in 2011 and 2012.
3A FFA LDE Quiz Team State Championship in 2011.
4A TSA Corbin Wood, State Champion in 2015
In the 2015 UIL Academic State meet, of which Van High School competes in annually, the Social Studies team placed second for team. Also, the Computer Science team placed fourth for team.

Theater
Van's theater department has appeared at the State UIL Theater Competition 12 times since 2002. Van has won the 3A UIL One-Act Play State Championship four times: In 2002 for "Godspell", 2005 for "The Caucasian Chalk Circle", 2007 for "Man of La Mancha", and 2011 for "A Midsummer Night's Dream".  Van has also placed second in state twice: in 2008 for "The Elephant Man", and 2014 for "And People All Around." They have placed third in state 5 times: in 2004 for "Assassins", 2009 for "The Devils", 2010 for "The Caucasian Chalk Circle", 2013 for " Mrs. Packard", and in 2015 for "Don Quixote."

Speech and debate
The Van Forensics program competes locally as well as statewide and nationally. The program has had top-ten finishers at the NDCA National Tournament, The Tournament of Champions, The TFA State Tournament, and UIL State Tournament as well as having students win TFA State, UIL State, and The NCFL Grand National Tournament. Two students qualified for Nationals in Original Oratory and two qualified for Nationals in Congressional Debate.

Athletics
The Van Vandals compete in these sports - 
Cross Country, Volleyball, Football, Basketball, Powerlifting, Golf, Tennis, Track, Softball & Baseball

State Champions
Boys Basketball - 
1942(1A), 2005(3A)
Football - 
1979(2A)
3A UIL State Powerlifting Title - Clayton Kendrick in 2009.
3A UIL State Track & Field Pole Vault - Chris Carroll in 1988.

State Finalists
Softball - 
2006(3A)
Volleyball - 
1975(2A)+, 1975(2A)^
Track & Field - 1995 & 1996 Pole Vault Nathan Abston 1996 (2nd), 1992 1993 & 1994 Pole Vault Chad Perry 1993 (2nd), 1988 Pole Vault Chris Carroll (1st) Bobby Cotton (4th), 1985 Pole Vault Steve English

Notable alumni
Leon Black-Former Head Basketball Coach at the University of Texas
Jermie Calhoun-Former College Football Player for the Oklahoma Sooners and Angelo State Rams.
Todd Fowler-Professional Football player for the Dallas Cowboys, All State Running Back, and member of the Vandal's 1979 State Championship Football team. (1985–88)

References

External links
Van ISD

Schools in Van Zandt County, Texas
Public high schools in Texas